Ane Håkansson Hansen (born 3 October 1975) is an internationally elite curler from Denmark. She has an MSc in biology and is currently a PhD student in Exercise and Sport Sciences at the University of Copenhagen. 

 

She made her World Championship debut in 2007 as the Alternate for Angelina Jensen's Danish team. She would return for the 2008 World Championships and the 2009 World Championships in the same position.

She will compete at the 2010 Vancouver Olympics as the Alternate for Team Denmark.

Teammates 
2009 Gangneung World Championships

2010 Vancouver Olympic Games

Denise Dupont, Fourth

Madeleine Dupont, Third

Angelina Jensen, Skip

Camilla Jensen, Lead

References 

Danish female curlers
Living people
Curlers at the 2010 Winter Olympics
Olympic curlers of Denmark
1975 births
21st-century Danish women